The ceremonial county of Derbyshire (which includes the unitary authority of Derby) is divided into 11 parliamentary constituencies: three borough constituencies
and eight county constituencies.

Constituencies

2010 boundary changes

Under the Fifth Periodic Review of Westminster constituencies, the Boundary Commission for England decided to increase the number of seats which covered Derbyshire from 10 to 11, with the re-establishment of Mid Derbyshire. As a consequence of resulting boundary changes, West Derbyshire was renamed Derbyshire Dales.

Proposed boundary changes 
See 2023 Periodic Review of Westminster constituencies for further details.

Following the abandonment of the Sixth Periodic Review (the 2018 review), the Boundary Commission for England formally launched the 2023 Review on 5 January 2021.Initial proposals were published on 8 June 2021 and, following two periods of public consultation, revised proposals were published on 8 November 2022. Final proposals will be published by 1 July 2023.

The commission has proposed retaining the current number of constituencies in Derbyshire, as detailed below, with minor boundary changes to reflect changes to electoral wards within the county and to bring the electorates within the statutory range.

Containing electoral wards from Amber Valley
Amber Valley
Derbyshire Dales (part)
Mid Derbyshire (part)
Containing electoral wards from Bolsover
Bolsover (part)
Containing electoral wards from Chesterfield
Chesterfield
North East Derbyshire (part)
Containing electoral wards from Derby
Derby North
Derby South
Mid Derbyshire (part)
Containing electoral wards from Derbyshire Dales
Derbyshire Dales (part)
Containing electoral wards from Erewash
Erewash
Mid Derbyshire (part)
Containing electoral wards from High Peak
High Peak
Containing electoral wards from North East Derbyshire
Bolsover (part)
North East Derbyshire (part)
Containing electoral wards from South Derbyshire
Derbyshire Dales (part)
South Derbyshire

Results history
Primary data source: House of Commons research briefing - General election results from 1918 to 2019

2019 
The number of votes cast for each political party who fielded candidates in constituencies comprising Derbyshire in the 2019 general election were as follows:

Percentage votes 

11974 &1979 - Liberal Party; 1983 & 1987 - SDP-Liberal Alliance

* Included in Other

Seats 

11974 &1979 - Liberal Party; 1983 & 1987 - SDP-Liberal Alliance

Maps

Historical representation by party
A cell marked → (with a different colour background to the preceding cell) indicates that the previous MP continued to sit under a new party name.

1885 to 1918

1918 to 1950

1950 to 1983

1983 to present

See also
 List of parliamentary constituencies in the East Midlands (region)

Notes

References

Derbyshire
Politics of Derbyshire
Derbyshire-related lists